The Zumbro River is a tributary of the Mississippi River in the Driftless Area of southeastern Minnesota in the United States. The Dakota name for this river is Wapka Wazi Oju (Pines Planted River), having reference to the grove of great white pines at Pine Island.

Course
The Zumbro rises as three forks:

The South Fork's course through Rochester has been channelized as part of a flood control project. It is dammed in Wabasha County, by the Lake Zumbro Hydroelectric Generating Plant to form Lake Zumbro.

At Rochester, the river measures approximately 153 cubic feet per second.

At Pine Island it collects the North Branch Middle Fork Zumbro River, which rises in southwestern Goodhue County and flows eastwardly through southern Goodhue and northern Dodge counties. At Oronoco it collects the South Branch Middle Fork Zumbro River, which rises in eastern Steele County and flows eastwardly into Dodge County, past Mantorville. The Middle Fork meets the South Fork in north-central Olmsted County as part of Zumbro Lake.

At this town, the river measures approximately 880 cubic feet per second.

Fish species near Rochester
Some species of fish that can be found in the Zumbro River near Rochester include the green sunfish; rock, smallmouth and largemouth bass; the common carp, creek chub, channel catfish, and northern pike.

See also
List of Minnesota rivers

References

DeLorme (1994).  Minnesota Atlas & Gazetteer.  Yarmouth, Maine: DeLorme.  .
Waters, Thomas F. (1977).  The Streams and Rivers of Minnesota.  Minneapolis: University of Minnesota Press.  .

 
Rivers of Minnesota
Tributaries of the Mississippi River
Driftless Area
Rivers of Wabasha County, Minnesota
Rivers of Dodge County, Minnesota
Rivers of Olmsted County, Minnesota
Rivers of Steele County, Minnesota
Rivers of Goodhue County, Minnesota
Rivers of Rice County, Minnesota